is a private junior Colleges in Chiyoda, Tokyo, Japan. It is one of the 149 junior colleges in Japan set up in 1950 when the junior college system started. It consists of three departments now.

Department and Graduate Course

Departments 
 Department of Life Sciences
 Department of Literature
 Department of Nursing

Advanced course 
 Department of Caregiveing

Available certifications 
 Nursing License
 Junior High School Teacher's License (2nd Class) in Japanese, English, Home Economics
 High School Teacher's License (2nd Class) in Japanese, English and Home Economics

See also 
 List of junior colleges in Japan

External links
  Kyoritsu Women's Junior College

Private universities and colleges in Japan
Japanese junior colleges
Universities and colleges in Tokyo